This is a list of Sri Lankan women Test cricketers. A Test match is an international cricket match between two of the leading cricketing nations. The list is arranged in the order in which each player won her Test cap. Where more than one player won her first Test cap in the same Test match, those players are listed alphabetically by the surname the player was using at the time of the match. To date, Sri Lanka have played just a single Women's Test match, against Pakistan in 1998.

Key

List of Players
Statistics are correct as of Sri Lanka women's only Test match, against Pakistan on 17 April 1998.

References

 
Sri Lanka Test
Women test cricketers
Cricketers